Joseph Knight Sr. (November 26, 1772 – February 2, 1847) was a close associate of Joseph Smith, founder of the Latter Day Saint movement. Knight provided significant material support to Smith's translation and publication of the Book of Mormon.

Life
Knight was born in Oakham, Massachusetts of primarily English Colonial ancestry. In 1795, he married Polly Peck. By 1800 they were living in Vermont. They moved to Colesville, New York, in 1808. Among Knight's children was Newel Knight.

The Latter Day Saint movement
Knight first met Joseph Smith while Smith was working for Josiah Stowell. Knight later hired the 20-year-old Smith to work for him. Knight owned four farms, a gristmill, and two carding machines. Knight assisted Smith in his courting of Emma Hale by lending him his sled. The Smiths also borrowed Knight's wagon when they went to pick up the golden plates from the Hill Cumorah.

Knight is addressed in a section of the Doctrine and Covenants dated to May 1829.

Knight was baptized into the Church of Christ on 28 June 1830. All his children, their spouses, his sister, and three of his wife's siblings, along with their spouses joined the church. The Knight family constituted the Colesville Branch, the first branch in the church. They later sold their homes and properties and migrated as a group to Thompson, Ohio, where they settled on the farm of Leman Copley, a former Shaker who had become a Latter Day Saint. Shortly after this Copley left the church, and forced the Colesville Saints to leave his farm so they then migrated to Jackson County, Missouri.

Knight and his family were driven from Jackson County in the Mormon persecutions of 1832–33 and eventually settled in Caldwell County, Missouri. They were driven from Missouri entirely in the winter of 1838–39 and settled shortly thereafter at Nauvoo, Illinois.  The Knights became, in effect, a prototype of all those hundreds of Saints who were bodily thrust from Jackson to Clay County, from Clay to Caldwell County, and later from the state. The personal descriptions and notarized statements that express their sufferings and losses become an index to the difficulties that whole mass of exiled people experienced.

Knight was a member of the Nauvoo Masonic Lodge.

The Knights left Nauvoo with the majority of Latter Day Saints in 1846, and journeyed west with the Mormon pioneers. Knight died on the trek west at Mount Pisgah, Iowa.

Legacy

A tourist attraction in Nineveh, New York, the former ancestral home of Joseph Knight Sr., is listed as the number one thing to do by Tripadvisor in the city.  Due to the COVID-19 pandemic, however, tours have been temporarily suspended.

Notes

References 

.
.
.
.
.
.
.

1772 births
1847 deaths
American Freemasons
Converts to Mormonism
Doctrine and Covenants people
History of the Latter Day Saint movement
Knight family (Latter Day Saints)
Latter Day Saints from Illinois
Latter Day Saints from Missouri
Latter Day Saints from New York (state)
Mormon pioneers
People from Broome County, New York
People from Colesville, New York
People from Worcester County, Massachusetts